The Santiago South Premier Division is a regional championship played in Santiago Island, Cape Verde and is a part of the Santiago South Zone Football Association. The winner of the championship plays in Cape Verdean football Championships of each season while the last two placed clubs relegates in the following season.  In 2007 and 2013 when Sporting Praia automatically qualified in the championships as they won their national titles in the previous season, a second place club qualified to the national championships.  The division features 12 clubs in the premier division for the second time, Varanda and Delta were relegated into the Second Division, Tchadense and Benfica were promoted last season.

History
The league was formed after the split of the Santiago Island League into the north and south zones in 2002 and the two are the youngest island leagues in Cape Verde, it featured clubs only from the municipality of Praia, Ribeira Grande de Santiago split in 2005 and featured from two parts up to 2010, clubs from São Domingos switched from the North to the South Zone in 2010, Garridos first played during the 2013–14 season. In the late 2000s and up to mid 2015, the championship/league contained ten clubs in each of the two divisions.  The Premier Division risen to twelve clubs started from the 2015–16 season and is the current number today. The championship has the most number of clubs in the country with the exception of the 2015–16 and the 2016–17 seasons which were second, shared with the island's North Zone. Up to the 2014–15 season, the 11th placed club plays with the second placed Second Division club to decide to remain in the Premier Division or be relegated, the last place club directly relegated into the second division in the following season. Started from the 2015–16 season, the last two placed clubs relegated and the top two Second Division clubs qualified as two clubs in the Second Division were registered for the 2016–17 season.

The reduction of the Santiago North Premier Division's clubs to ten now makes it the sole tier 2 competition having the most number of clubs in the nation. The 2017–18 season has the second division.

Title history
Every title won are clubs that serves the whole of Praia.  The first club won after the breakup was Travadores in 2003, Académica was the second winner in 2004, Sporting Praia won two consecutive titles in 2005 and in 2006.  Académica won in 2007, then Sporting in 2008, Académica won two back to back titles in 2009, then Sporting in 2010.  Boavista won their first in 2011.  Sporting won three consecutive titles, one was their recent in 2014.  Boavista won their recent title in 2015.  Desportivo won their only title in 2016.  Sporting won their tenth title in 2017.

Records and successes
Sporting Praia had the longest streak with only wins which was 19 which lasted from April 3, 2004, to April 10, 2005.  Sporting Praia recently surpassed the record point total of 49 in 2005 and had 53 points at the end of the 2016–17 season.

Clubs of the 2017-18 season
The 2017–18 season was the third season featuring twelve clubs.
 Académica - Praia
 ADESBA - Craveiro Lopes neighborhood
 Benfica da Praia
 Boavista Praia
 Celtic - Achadina de Baixo neighborhood
 Desportivo da Praia
 Eugenio Lima - based in the homonymous neighborhood - finished 11, to be relegated
 Ribeira Grande - based in the homonymous municipality and serves Cidade Velha, Porto Gouveia and Porto Mosquito - champion and promoted
 Sporting Praia
 Tchadense - Achada Santo Antônio neighborhood
 Travadores - Praia
 AD Tira Chapéu - based in the homonymous neighborhood the west of Praia - finished last, to be relegated

Winners
2002: Sporting Clube da Praia
2002/03 : CD Travadores
2003/04 : Académica (Praia)
2005 : Sporting Clube da Praia
2005/06 : Sporting Clube da Praia
2007 : Sporting Clube da Praia
2007/08 : Sporting Clube da Praia
2008/09 : Académica (Praia)
2009/10 : Sporting Clube da Praia
2010/11 : Boavista FC (Cape Verde)
2011/12 : Sporting Praia
2012/13 : Sporting Praia
2013/14 : Sporting Praia
2014/15 : Boavista
2015-16: Desportivo da Praia
2016–17: Sporting Clube da Praia
2017–18: Académica da Praia

Performance By Club

Topscorers

By season

Seasons in the Santiago South Premier Division
Half listed
The number of seasons that each team (in alphabetical order) has played in the Premier Division from 1999 to 2017. In Brackets are their overall appearances with the Santiago Island (or Regional) Championships. The teams in Bold participating in the 2017-18 Santiago South Premier Division:

See also
Sports in Santiago, Cape Verde
Santiago South Cup
Santiago South Super Cup
Santiago South Opening Tournament

References

External links
Santiao Island League (South) 
Santiago Island Championships at RSSSF
Information about the league at RTC 
History of ARFSS at Facebook 

 
Second level football leagues in Cape Verde
1999 establishments in Cape Verde
Sports leagues established in 1999